Bridal Veil Falls is a  waterfall that flows from Lake Serene directly to the South Fork Skykomish River on the creek of the same name in the U.S. state of Washington.

Bridal Veil Falls is part of the Mount Baker-Snoqualmie National Forest. A hiking trail leads from a parking area to the falls.

Notes 

Waterfalls of Washington (state)
Waterfalls of Snohomish County, Washington
Tiered waterfalls